Kalaje Gnipate (born 24 July 1985) is a New Caledonian international footballer for AS Mont-Dore and the New Caledonia national team. He played in the 2012 OFC Nations Cup.

References

External links

1985 births
Living people
New Caledonian footballers
New Caledonia international footballers
Association football forwards
AS Mont-Dore players
2012 OFC Nations Cup players